Women's water polo at the 2017 Summer Universiade was held in Taipei, Taiwan, from 18 to 29 August 2017.

Results 
All times are Taiwan Standard Time (UTC+08:00)

Preliminary round

Group A

Group B

Final round

9th-12th places

Final eight

Quarterfinals

Semifinals

5th-8th semifinals

Ranking matches

11th place match

9th place match

7th place match

5th place match

Bronze medal match

Gold medal match

Final standing

References

External links

Women
Universiade